Bunaeopsis is a genus of moths in the family Saturniidae. The genus was erected by Eugène Louis Bouvier in 1927.

Species
Bunaeopsis angolana (Le Cerf, 1918)
Bunaeopsis annabellae Lemaire & Rougeot, 1975
Bunaeopsis arabella (Aurivillius, 1893)
Bunaeopsis aurantiaca (Rothschild, 1895)
Bunaeopsis bomfordi Pinhey, 1962
Bunaeopsis chromata Darge, 2003
Bunaeopsis clementi Lemaire & Rougeot, 1975
Bunaeopsis ferruginea (Bouvier, 1927)
Bunaeopsis fervida Darge, 2003
Bunaeopsis francottei Darge, 1992
Bunaeopsis hersilia (Westwood, 1849)
Bunaeopsis jacksoni (Jordan, 1908)
Bunaeopsis licharbas (Maassen & Weyding, 1885)
Bunaeopsis lueboensis Bouvier, 1931
Bunaeopsis maasseni (Strand, 1911)
Bunaeopsis macrophthalma (Kirby, 1881)
Bunaeopsis oubie (Guerin-Meneville, 1849)
Bunaeopsis phidias (Weymer, 1909)
Bunaeopsis princeps (Le Cerf, 1918)
Bunaeopsis rothschildi (Le Cerf, 1911)
Bunaeopsis saffronica Pinhey, 1972
Bunaeopsis scheveniana Lemaire & Rougeot, 1974
Bunaeopsis schoenheiti (Wichgraff, 1914)
Bunaeopsis terrali Darge, 1993
Bunaeopsis thyene (Weymer, 1896)
Bunaeopsis vau (Fawcett, 1915)
Bunaeopsis zaddachi (Dewitz, 1879)

References

Saturniinae
Taxa named by Eugène Louis Bouvier